Elizabeth H. Shuler (born 1970) is an American labor activist and, since August 5, 2021, President of the AFL–CIO. She is the first woman to be elected president of the federation. She was previously the first woman and (as of 2009) the youngest person to hold the position of Secretary-Treasurer. She is the highest-ranking woman in the labor federation's history. From her election to the retirement of Arlene Holt Baker in 2013 was the first time that two of the three officer positions in the AFL–CIO were held by women;
her election as president with Fred Redmond succeeding her as Secretary-Treasurer marked the first time two of the three positions were held by African Americans.

Early life and IBEW career
Liz Shuler was born to Lance and Joyce Shuler in 1970. Her father was an electrical lineman for Portland General Electric (PGE), and her mother worked there as a secretary. Although her father was a union member, clerical workers at PGE were not unionized. Shuler was raised in the town of Gladstone, Oregon, and attended public school in the city. She received her bachelor's degree in journalism from the University of Oregon in 1992. While in college, she worked summers at PGE and was active in the state Democratic Party.

Shuler first became active in union work after college.  Her first job was as a union organizer for the International Brotherhood of Electrical Workers (IBEW) Local 125, working on a campaign to organize clerical workers at PGE. She became a lobbyist for the IBEW in 1997, representing the union before the Oregon Legislature. One of her chief accomplishments for the union was the defeat of a bill (promoted by the Enron Corp.) to deregulate Oregon's electricity market. She also taught in the union's Construction Organizing Membership Education and Training (COMET) and Membership Education and Mobilization for Organizing (MEMO) union organizing programs. Shuler also served on the State of Oregon Management-Labor Advisory Committee on Workers' Compensation, and was appointed an IBEW delegate to the Northwest Oregon Central Labor Council. In 1998, she led the AFL–CIO's successful effort to defeat California Proposition 226, which would have denied dues check-off to public employees belonging to unions and required all union members in the state to annually give their assent before any portion of their dues could be used for political purposes.

After the California effort, Shuler was appointed an IBEW international representative and moved to Washington, D.C., where she worked in the IBEW's Political/Legislative Affairs Department. She was appointed executive assistant to IBEW President Edwin Hill in June 2004, making her the highest-ranking woman in the union's history. Shuler supervised and coordinated 11 of the IBEW's departments, including its education, research, political/legislative affairs, public relations, and workplace safety divisions.

AFL–CIO career
On July 7, 2009, AFL–CIO Secretary-Treasurer Richard Trumka, then seeking election to the labor federation's presidency, chose Shuler as his running mate for Secretary-Treasurer. Gregory Junemann, president of the International Federation of Professional and Technical Engineers, also ran for the position. Shuler defeated Junemann for the position on September 16, 2009.

Shuler stated her intent to spend much of her term reaching out to workers under the age of 35 and using new media to reach out to workers, their families, and union supporters. She also said she would work with the AFL–CIO's affiliates to balance the federation's budget, which was running a deficit and whose liabilities exceeded its assets by $2.3 million in 2008.

Trumka appointed Shuler head of the AFL–CIO's youth outreach efforts.  Under the AFL–CIO constitution, Shuler became the acting AFL–CIO President upon Trumka's death on August 5, 2021.  On August 20, she was elected to fill the remainder of Trumka's term through June 2022.

Other activities
Shuler is active in the Women's Campaign Fund, a political action committee which supports pro-choice women running for election to political office, and a supporter of the International Women's Democracy Center. She has also been active in the Oregon and Washington chapters of Women in the Trades, organizations which promote opportunities for women in the blue-collar skilled trades.

Notes

References

External links
Liz Shuler, speaking at the AFL–CIO state and local affiliates' conference, September 12, 2009
Shuler, Elizabeth H. "A New Generation of Opportunity." Salem Statesman-Journal. September 7, 2009.
Oregon Tradeswomen
Washington Women in the Trades
Women's Campaign Fund

1970 births
AFL–CIO people
American lobbyists
International Brotherhood of Electrical Workers people
Living people
Oregon Democrats
People from Clackamas County, Oregon
Trade unionists from Washington, D.C.
University of Oregon alumni
Trade unionists from Oregon
American women trade unionists
Presidents of the AFL–CIO
21st-century American women